Frederick William Townley-Smith (2 April 1887 – 5 July 1961) was a Co-operative Commonwealth Federation member of the House of Commons of Canada. He was born in Leicestershire, England and became a farmer by career.

Townley-Smith moved to Canada in 1903. He was educated at Loughborough in the United Kingdom.

He was elected to Parliament at the North Battleford riding in the 1945 general election and served one term, the 20th Canadian Parliament, then did not seek re-election in the 1949 election.

References

External links
 

1887 births
1961 deaths
Co-operative Commonwealth Federation MPs
20th-century Canadian politicians
Canadian farmers
English emigrants to Canada
Members of the House of Commons of Canada from Saskatchewan